SO10 was the former designation of the Metropolitan Police's Covert Operations Group.

History
The group's origins can be traced back to 1960, with the formation of what was known as the Criminal Investigation Branch, which later evolved and was merged into SO10 and the Public Order Unit. The group's original name referred to its Specialist Operations designation prior to restructuring of the Metropolitan Police, which saw it re- designated to the Specialist Crime Directorate as SCD10, though it is still colloquially referred to as SO10.

Role   
The group's role is to provide specially trained officers and resources for cases requiring covert policing and evidence gathering. It had responsibility for all undercover policing in London, particularly focusing on surveillance and relying on support from armed officers and specialist surveillance photography. Some of their most notable work is that in counter-terrorism operations, the most high profile of which led to the shooting of Brazilian Jean Charles de Menezes who was mistakenly identified as a suspected suicide bomber on July 22, 2005.

References

External links
Metropolitan Police Service - SC&O - Covert Policing webpage

Metropolitan Police units